Cyathopoma randalana is a species of land snail with an operculum, a terrestrial gastropod mollusk in the family Cyclophoridae.

This species is endemic to Madagascar. Its natural habitat is subtropical or tropical dry forests.

References

Cyclophoridae
Molluscs of Madagascar
Gastropods described in 1999
Taxonomy articles created by Polbot